Pimelea trichostachya, commonly known as annual riceflower, spiked riceflower or flax weed, is a species of flowering plant in the family Thymelaeaceae and is endemic to continental Australia. It is a slender, semi-woody, annual shrub with narrowly elliptic or linear leaves and densely hairy, white or yellow flowers and green, purple-tinged fruit. It is toxic to livestock.

Description
The leaves are glabrous or sparsely hairy. The flowers are bisexual, white or yellow and densely covered with long, spreading hairs.

Taxonomy
Pimelea trichostachya was first formally described in 1848 by John Lindley in Thomas Mitchell's Journal of an Expedition into the Interior of Tropical Australia. The specific epithet (trichostachya) means "hairy flower-spike".

Distribution
Annual rice-flower mainly grows in deep sand im mallee and occurs in all mainland states and the Northern Territory, but is absent from most of the north of the country, from the east and west coasts and from most of Victoria.

Effect on livestock
Pimelea trichostachya, along with P. simplex and P. elongata, is toxic to stock. The first cases of "St George disease" were reported in Queensland in 1921, but it was not until 1960 that pimelea poisoning was identified as the cause. Symptoms of poisoning in cattle include fluid swellings, mostly under the jaw, diarrhoea and weight loss. Horses and sheep are also susceptible.

References

trichostachya
Malvales of Australia
Flora of New South Wales
Flora of Victoria (Australia)
Flora of Western Australia
Flora of South Australia
Flora of Queensland
Flora of the Northern Territory
Plants described in 1848
Taxa named by John Lindley